KWBN (channel 44) is a religious television station in Honolulu, Hawaii, United States, airing programming from the Daystar Television Network. The station is owned and operated by Ho'ona'auao Community Television, a subsidiary of Daystar parent company Word of God Fellowship. KWBN's transmitter is located in Akupu, Hawaii.

KWBN, which signed on the air in 1999, is one of six religious stations serving the Honolulu television market, with KWHE, KAAH-TV, KALO, KKAI and KUPU being the other five.

KWBN's allocation channel, like KALO and PBS member station KHET, is reserved for non-commercial use, and as such, must rely on paid religious programs, educational fare, and viewer donations for support.

Technical information

Subchannels
The station's digital signal is multiplexed:

Analog-to-digital conversion
In 2009, KWBN left channel 44 and moved to channel 43 when the analog-to-digital conversion was completed.

On April 13, 2017, the FCC announced that KWBN would relocate to RF channel 26 by April 12, 2019 as a result of the broadcast incentive auction. The move was completed in December 2018.

References

External links
 Official website

WBN
Television channels and stations established in 1999
Daystar (TV network) affiliates
1999 establishments in Hawaii